Bobolice (formerly ) is a town in northwest Poland, part of Koszalin County, West Pomeranian Voivodeship. As of December 2021, it has a population of 3,896.

Notable residents
 Paul Kleinschmidt (1883–1949), German painter and graphic artist
 Hans-Jürgen Heise (1930-2013), German author and poet

References

External links

 Official website 
 Jewish Community of Bobolice on Virtual Shtetl

Cities and towns in West Pomeranian Voivodeship
Koszalin County